Golberdon is a village in Cornwall, England situated  north-east of Liskeard. Golberdon is in the civil parish of South Hill (where the 2011 census population was included )

References

Villages in Cornwall